Lophospermum is a genus of herbaceous perennial climbers or scramblers, native to mountainous regions of Mexico and Guatemala. Those that climb use twining leaf stalks. Their flowers are tubular, in shades of red, violet and purple, the larger flowers being pollinated by hummingbirds. Now placed in the greatly expanded family Plantaginaceae, the genus was traditionally placed in the Scrophulariaceae. The close relationship with some other genera, particularly Maurandya and Rhodochiton, has led to confusion over the names of some species.

Lophospermum erubescens and Lophospermum scandens are cultivated as ornamental plants, as climbers or trailers. Various Lophospermum cultivars are grown, often under trade names such as "Lofos®".

Description

Lophospermum species are herbaceous perennial climbers with fibrous roots. They climb by means of twining leaf stalks (petioles) rather than tendrils or twining stems. The long stems are branched, becoming woody at the base with age. In some species the stems grow from a woody caudex – a swollen, bulb-like structure at the base of the stem. The leaves are triangular or heart-shaped with a pointed apex and toothed edges (crenate or dentate). Both stems and leaves may have a purplish colour.

Species generally flower and fruit over a long season; for example, from April to the following January in the case of Lophospermum erubescens. The flowers are borne singly on stems (peduncles) which are either held horizontally or grow upwards. The calyx has sepals that are either free or somewhat joined at the base, and overlap or curve outwards. They may be green or tinted with red or purple. The flowers have five petals in shades of red, violet or dark purple, joined at the base to form a tube. The free lobes of the upper two petals are differentiated from those of the lower three petals: for example, the upper two may curve back and the lower three point forwards. There are two prominent folds (plicae) running along the length of the base of the flower tube, usually yellowish in colour with hairs whose length helps to distinguish the species. There are four fertile stamens, of two different lengths, and one infertile stamen. The stamens and style are held inside the flower.

The ovary has two chambers (locules). After fertilization, an ovoid or globe-shaped capsule forms filled with brown seeds, each with a circular "wing" around it.

Taxonomy

The genus Lophospermum was first described in March 1826 by David Don in a paper read to the Linnean Society of London. His account was summarized in the same month in the Philosophical Magazine and Journal and subsequently published in 1827 in the Transactions of the Linnean Society. Don described Lophospermum as closely related to Antirrhinum and Maurandya but distinguished by its bell-shaped (campanulate) flowers and winged seeds. Lophospermum means "with crested seeds". Initially two species were described, Lophospermum scandens and Lophospermum physalodes. (The latter is now Melasma physalodes.)

The genus is placed in the tribe Antirrhineae; within this tribe, it is closely related to Maurandya (including Maurandella), Mabrya and Rhodochiton. It has been included in Maurandya as section Lophospermum. Rhodochiton has been included in Lophospermum as section Rhodochiton. Scientific names within these three genera have been confused; for example, an image accepted by Tropicos as Lophospermum erubescens bears the caption Maurandya barclaiana (a variant spelling of Maurandya barclayana).

Phylogeny
A number of molecular phylogenetic studies have shown that subtribe Maurandyinae, defined by Elisen to consist of the five North American genera Holmgrenanthe, Lophospermum, Mabrya, Maurandya and Rhodochiton, forms a monophyletic group, which is related to the Old World genera Cymbalaria and Asarina. Gehebrehiwet et al. suggested that the Maurandyinae could be expanded to include Cymbalaria and Asarina. Vargas et al. presented the following cladogram in 2013:

Vargas et al. concluded that the Antirrhineae evolved in the Old World and subsequently colonized North America more than once, probably in the Miocene epoch. One such colonization led to the evolution of the Maurandyinae (in Elisen's sense).

Species

, The Plant List accepts seven species (based on Tropicos and the World Checklist of Selected Plant Families):

Lophospermum breedlovei Elisens
Lophospermum chiapense Elisens
Lophospermum erubescens D.Don
Lophospermum purpurascens Elisens
Lophospermum purpusii (Brandegee) Rothm.
Lophospermum scandens D.Don
Lophospermum turneri Elisens

In his 1985 monograph, Wayne J. Elisens included Rhodochiton in Lophospermum as section Rhodochiton:
 Lophospermum atrosanguineum = Rhodochiton atrosanguineum (Zucc.) Rothm.
 Lophospermum hintonii = Rhodochiton hintonii (Elisens) D.A.Sutton
 Lophospermum nubicola = Rhodochiton nubicola (Elisens) D.A.Sutton

Distribution and habitat

Species of Lophospermum are native to mountainous regions of Mexico and parts of adjoining Guatemala: the Sierra Madre Oriental, the Sierra Madre del Sur and the Sierra Madre de Chiapas, as well as the Altiplano and the Cordillera Neovolcánica. Most species have small discrete ranges; the exception is L. erubescens which has a wider distribution in oak forests of the Sierra Madre Oriental. L. scandens will grow on recent lava flows.

Lophospermum erubescens has become naturalized in many tropical and subtropical areas of the world, including Colombia, Venezuela, Jamaica and Hawaii, as well as Australia (New South Wales and Queensland).

Ecology

Lophospermum erubescens and L. scandens are known to be pollinated by hummingbirds. The pollinators of the remaining species are unknown, but Elisens suggests that, based on floral colour and morphology, L. purpusii is similarly hummingbird-pollinated, whereas L. breedlovei, L. chiapense, L. purpurascens and L. turneri may be pollinated by bees, as they have differently shaped flowers, with landing platforms and narrower openings to the flower tubes. The nectar composition of L. purpusii is similar to other hummingbird-pollinated flowers, whereas that of L. turneri is quite different, with a very high proportion of sucrose.

Cultivation

Lophospermum erubescens has been cultivated as an ornamental climber since at least the 19th century. Joseph Paxton described its cultivation in 1836, saying that it was "a very fine creeper and deserves growing by every lover of plants". Other species that have been cultivated include L. purpusii and L. scandens. Those which are the subject of US Plant Patents are described as originating from the hybrid Lophospermum scandens × L. erubescens, a hybrid known since the 1840s.

As noted above, Lophospermum species have in the past been placed in Maurandya and the two genera have regularly been confused, particularly in cultivation. For example, the cultivar Lophospermum 'Magic Dragon' (a cross between Lophospermum 'Red Dragon' and L. erubescens) was patented under the genus name Maurandya. Cultivated species of Lophospermum have longer flowers than those of Maurandya and leaves with toothed rather than entire margins. The Suntory cultivars were patented under the generic name Asarina, now treated as an entirely European genus.

Plants may be grown from seed and treated as annuals. In frost-free climates, or where the roots can be protected from frost, plants may be perennial, regrowing from the base after dying back in the winter. Selected forms and cultivars may be grown from cuttings.

Notes

References

External links

 
 Lophospermum in USDA

 
Plantaginaceae genera